Qualification for the men's tournament at the 2014 Winter Olympics was determined by the IIHF World Ranking following the 2012 Men's World Ice Hockey Championships. The top nine teams in the world ranking received automatic berths into the Olympics, while all other teams had an opportunity to qualify for the remaining three spots in the Olympics. As with Canada in 2010, the IIHF made no mention of direct qualification for the host.

Qualified teams

Notes

Direct qualification
To qualify directly, a nation had to be ranked in the top nine following the 2012 Men's World Ice Hockey Championships. Using the IIHF World Ranking points system, the current year received full value, and each preceding year was worth 25% less. The following was a ranking based on points already accumulated toward Olympic qualification of all countries at the top level, or who are ranked amongst them.
To qualify directly, a nation had to be ranked in the top nine following the 2012 Men's World Ice Hockey Championships. Using the IIHF World Ranking points system, the current year received full value, and each preceding year was worth 25% less. The following was a ranking based on points already accumulated toward Olympic qualification of all countries at the top level, or who are ranked amongst them.

Olympic preliminary qualification
One round robin was played on 17–19, September 2012 in Zagreb, Croatia. The winner of the group advanced to the prequalification tournaments.

Group K

All times are local (UTC+2).

Olympic pre-qualification
Three round robins were played from 8–11 November 2012. They were played in Budapest, Kyiv and Nikkō. 21st ranked Great Britain had the option to host group J, but passed on the right to the next highest-ranked nation. The winners of each group advanced to the final qualification tournaments.

Group G

All times are local (UTC+1).

Group H

All times are local (UTC+2).

Group J

All times are local (UTC+9).

Final qualification tournaments
Three round robins were played from 7–10 February 2013. They were played in Bietigheim-Bissingen, Riga, and Vojens. The three group winners qualified for the Olympic tournament.

Group D

All times are local (UTC+1).

Group E

All times are local (UTC+2).

Group F

All times are local (UTC+1).

References

External links
World Ice Hockey Championships 2012
World Ice Hockey Championships 2011
 World Ice Hockey Championships 2010
2010 Olympic Games
World Ice Hockey Championships 2009
2014 Olympic format and qualification

Qualification
Qualification for the 2014 Winter Olympics
2012 in ice hockey
2013 in ice hockey